Junior van der Velden (born 14 August 1998) is a Dutch football player who plays as a centre back for Italian club Arezzo.

Club career
He made his professional debut in the Eerste Divisie for Jong FC Utrecht on 5 August 2016 in a game against NAC Breda.

On 20 August 2021, he signed a two-year contract with Italian Serie C club Viterbese. On 7 January 2022, his contract with Viterbese was terminated by mutual consent. On the same day, he joined Arezzo in "serie D", the fourth division of Italian leagues.

References

External links
 

1998 births
Living people
Footballers from Utrecht (city)
Dutch footballers
Association football defenders
Eerste Divisie players
Jong FC Utrecht players
FC Den Bosch players
Serie C players
U.S. Viterbese 1908 players
S.S. Arezzo players
Dutch expatriate footballers
Dutch expatriate sportspeople in Italy
Expatriate footballers in Italy